This list of early skyscrapers details a range of tall, commercial buildings built between 1880 and the 1930s, predominantly in the United States cities of New York and Chicago, but also across the rest of the U.S. and in many other parts of the world.

The first skyscrapers (1880–1899)

United States

California
 Central Tower
 Old Chronicle Building

Georgia
 Equitable Building
 Flatiron Building
 J. Mack Robinson College of Business Administration Building

Illinois
 Fisher Building
 Home Insurance Building
 Manhattan Building
 Marquette Building
 Marshall Field and Company Building
 Masonic Temple
 Monadnock Building
 New York Life Insurance Building
 Old Colony Building
 Rand McNally Building
 Reliance Building
 Rookery Building
 Tacoma Building

Iowa
 Observatory Building

Massachusetts
 27 State St.
 62 Boylston Street
 Ames Building
 Fiske Building
 Winthrop Building

Michigan
 United Way Community Services Building
 Hammond Building
 Majestic Building
 Union Trust Building

Minnesota
 Metropolitan Building
 Pioneer Building

Missouri
 Wainwright Building

New York

New York City
 American Tract Society Building
 56 Pine Street
 American Surety Building
 Bayard–Condict Building
 Bowling Green Offices Building
 Empire Building
 Gillender Building
 Hotel Chelsea
 Hotel Gerard
 Manhattan Life Insurance Building
 New York Times Building
 New York Tribune Building
 New York World Building
 Osborne Apartments
 Park Row Building
 St. Paul Building
 Temple Court Building
 The Ansonia

Rochester
 Wilder Building

Buffalo
 Dun Building, Buffalo
 Ellicott Square Building
 Guaranty Building

Albany
 100 State Street, Albany

Pennsylvania
 Land Title Building
 North American Building

Utah
 Boston Building, Salt Lake City
 First Security Building, Salt Lake City
 Joseph Smith Memorial Building
 Judge Building
 Kearns Building
 Newhouse Building (Salt Lake City)

Wisconsin
 Milwaukee City Hall
 Pabst Building

Washington D.C.
 Sun Building
 The Cairo

Rest of the world

Asia

Japan
 Ryounkaku

Australia

Melbourne
 APA Building

Sydney
 Culwulla Chambers

Europe

Netherlands
 Witte Huis

United Kingdom
 Queen Anne's Mansions

The "First Great Age" (1900–19)

United States

Alabama

 City Federal Building
 Empire Building

California

 Bank of America Building
 Hobart Building
 Merchants Exchange Building
 Oakland City Hall

Colorado

 Daniels & Fisher Tower

Connecticut

 Travelers Tower

Florida

 121 Atlantic Place
 American National Bank Building (Pensacola, Florida)
 Dyal–Upchurch Building
 Heard National Bank Building, Jacksonville
 Florida Life Building

Georgia

 Candler Building (Atlanta)
 J. Mack Robinson College of Business Administration Building

Illinois

 Brooks Building
 Chicago Building
 Continental Illinois
 Hotel Aurora (Aurora, Illinois)
 Peoples Gas Building
 Renaissance Blackstone Hotel
 Roanoke Building
 Santa Fe Building

Iowa

 Fleming Building
 Liberty Building

Indiana

 110 East Washington Street
 Barnes and Thornburg Building
 Fletcher Trust Building
 One North Pennsylvania

Maryland

Baltimore Gas and Electric Company Building
 Emerson Bromo-Seltzer Tower
 One Calvert Plaza

Massachusetts

 1200 Main Street Springfield
 Custom House Tower
 Hotel Kimball Springfield

Michigan

 AT&T Michigan Headquarters
 Book Tower
 Chrysler House
 David Whitney Building
 Ford Building
 Kales Building
 Marquette Building
 Michigan Central Station
 Penobscot Building Annex
 Vinton Building

Minnesota
 Commerce Building (Saint Paul, Minnesota)
 First National Bank Building Annex, Saint Paul
 Great Northern Building, Saint Paul
 The Lowry Medical Arts Building, Saint Paul
 The Saint Paul Hotel, Saint Paul

Missouri
 Commerce Trust Building
 Railway Exchange Building (St. Louis)

Nebraska

 First National Bank Building (Omaha, Nebraska)

New York

New York City
 1 Wall Street Court
 14 Wall Street
 49 Chambers
 90 West Street
 150 Nassau Street
 195 Broadway
 American Surety Building
 Atlantic Mutual Insurance Company Building
 Bank of the Metropolis Building
 Bowling Green Offices Building
 Broad Exchange Building
 Broadway–Chambers Building
 Bush Tower
 City Investing Building
 Consolidated Edison Building
 Empire Building
 Equitable Building
 Equitable Life Building
 Flatiron Building
 Germania Life Insurance Company Building
 Gillender Building
 Home Life Building
 Hudson Terminal
 Liberty Tower
 Manhattan Life Insurance Building
 Manhattan Municipal Building 
 Metropolitan Life Insurance Company Tower
 Morse Building
 New York Times Building
 New York Tribune Building
 New York World Building
 One Times Square
 Park Row Building
 Singer Building
 St. Paul Building
 Trinity and United States Realty Buildings
 Western Union Telegraph Building
 Whitehall Building
 Woolworth Building

Rochester
 Kodak Tower

Buffalo
 Cathedral Place, Buffalo
 The Marin
 Verizon/AT&T Building, Buffalo

Ohio

 Bartlett Building
 Federal Reserve Bank of Cleveland
 Fourth & Walnut Center
 LeVeque Tower
 Fourth and Vine Tower
 Rockefeller Building (Cleveland)

Pennsylvania

 Arrott Building
 Benedum-Trees Building
 Farmers Bank Building
 Frick Building
 Land Title Building
 Oliver Building
 The Bellevue-Stratford Hotel
 The Carlyle

Tennessee

 Exchange Building
 The Burwell

Texas

 Adolphus Hotel
 ALICO Building
 Kirby Building

Utah

 hotel monaco salt lake city
 Walker Center

Virginia

 First National Bank Building

Washington

 Old National Bank Building
 Smith Tower

Elsewhere in the world

United Kingdom

 Royal Liver Building
 Tower Building, Liverpool

Argentina
 Edificio Otto Wulf
 Galeria Guemes
 Archivo General de la Nacion
 Plaza Hotel Buenos Aires
 Railway Building

Australia
 Culwulla Chambers
 Dovers Building
 Trust Building

Germany

Berlin

Siemensturm

Jena

Netherlands

Poland
 PAST (Poland)

Russia

Moscow
 Afremov's house
 House of Nirnsee
South Africa

 Union Buildings

Ukraine
 Bendersky's house
 Ginsburg House (Kyiv Paris)
 Doctor's castle
 The Ginsburg skyscraper
 Fyodor Alyoshin's profitable house

Inter-war period, boom and depression (1920–1939)

United States

Arizona
 Heard Building
 Hotel San Carlos (Phoenix)
 Luhrs Building
 Luhrs Tower
 Orpheum Lofts
 Pioneer Hotel
 Professional Building (Phoenix, Arizona)
 Valley National Bank Building (Tucson, Arizona)
 Westward Ho (Phoenix)

Connecticut

 Southern New England Telephone Company Administration Building
 The Stark Building
 Travelers Tower

California

 140 New Montgomery
 225 Bush Street
 450 Sutter Street
 Bank of Italy (Fresno, California)
 El Cortez Hotel
 Helm Building, Fresno
 Hotel Californian, Fresno
 Los Angeles City Hall
 Pacific Southwest Building
 Richfield Tower
 Russ Building
 Shell Building
 Tribune Tower

Florida

 Freedom Tower (Miami)
 Miami Biltmore Hotel
 Miami-Dade County Courthouse

Georgia

 Fourth National Bank Building
 Rhodes-Haverty Building

Idaho

 Hoff Building

Indiana

AT&T Building (Indianapolis)
Lincoln Bank Tower

Illinois

 333 North Michigan
 35 East Wacker
 Carbide & Carbon Building
 Chicago Board of Trade Building
 Chicago Temple Building
 Civic Opera Building
 Faust Landmark
 Field Building
 LaSalle-Wacker Building
 Leland Tower
 London Guarantee Building
 Mather Tower
 Metropolitan Tower 
 Morrison Hotel
 One North LaSalle
 Palmolive Building 
 Pittsfield Building 
 Powhatan Apartments
 Randolph Tower
 Rockford Trust Building
 Tribune Tower
 Trustees System Service Building 
 Wrigley Building

Iowa

 Equitable Building
 Wells Fargo Building

Louisiana

 Charity Hospital (New Orleans)
 First National Bank of Commerce Building
 Four Winds (New Orleans)
 Hibernia Bank Building
 Louisiana State Capitol
 National American Bank Building

Maine

 People's United Bank Building
 Time and Temperature Building
 Verizon Building, Bangor

Maryland

 Bank of America Building (Baltimore)

Massachusetts

 Suffolk County Courthouse
 US Shoe Machinery Corporation Building

Michigan

 AT&T Michigan Headquarters
 Boji Tower
 Book Tower
 Buhl Building
 Cadillac Place
 Cadillac Tower
 David Broderick Tower
 David Stott Building
 First National Building
 Fisher Building
 Fort Shelby Hotel
 Grand Park Centre
 Guardian Building
 Industrial Building (Detroit)
 Hudson Department Store
 Macabees Building
 Penobscot Building
 United Artists Theatre Building
 Washington Boulevard Building
 Water Board Building
 Westin Book Cadillac Hotel

Minnesota

 CenturyLink Building
 CenturyLink Building, Saint Paul
 First National Bank Building
 Foshay Tower
 Lowry Hotel, Saint Paul
 Minnesota Building
 Saint Paul City Hall and Ramsey County Courthouse
 Saint Paul City Hall Annex
 United States Post Office/Custom House, Saint Paul

Mississippi

 King Edward Hotel (Jackson, Mississippi)
 Lamar Life Building
 Regions Bank Building (Jackson, Mississippi)
 Standard Life Building

Missouri

 909 Walnut
 925 Grand
 Civil Courts Building
 Kansas City City Hall
 Kansas City Power and Light Building
 Oak Tower
 Southwestern Bell Building

Nebraska

 Nebraska State Capitol

New Jersey

 155 washington street
 24 Commerce Street
 Bamberger's
 Camden City Hall
 Eleven 80
 Griffith Building
 Home Office Building
 Military Park Building
 National Newark Building
 New Jersey Bell Headquarters Building
 Prudential Headquarters#Gibraltar Building
 The Claridge Hotel
 Union County Courthouse (New Jersey)

New York

New York City
 1 Wall Street
 10 East 40th Street
 110 East 42nd Street
 120 Wall Street
 15 Broad Street
 20 Exchange Place
 20 West Street
 21 West Street
 26 Broadway
 30 Rockefeller Plaza
 32 Avenue of the Americas
 330 West 42nd Street
 40 Wall Street
 500 Fifth Avenue
 60 Hudson Street
 70 Pine Street
 American Radiator Building
 Chanin Building
 Chrysler Building 
 Cunard Building
 Daily News Building
 Empire State Building
 Fuller Building
 Helmsley Building
 Metropolitan Life North Building
 Nelson Tower
 New York Life Building
 One Grand Central Place
 Paramount Building
 Pershing Square Building
 Rockefeller Center 
 The Beresford
 The Century
 The Eldorado
 The Majestic
 The Pierre
 The San Remo
 The Sherry-Netherland
 Verizon Building
 Waldorf Astoria
 Wall and Hanover Building
 Williamsburgh Savings Bank Tower
 Wyndham New Yorker Hotel

Buffalo
 42 Delaware Avenue, Buffalo
 Buffalo Central Terminal
 Buffalo City Hall
 Convention Tower, Buffalo
 Electric Tower
 Liberty Building
 Rand Building

Rochester
 Sibley's, Lindsay and Curr Building
 Times Square Building

Syracuse
 Hills Building, Syracuse
 Niagara Mohawk Building
 State Tower Building

Albany
 69 State Street, Albany
 90 State Street, Albany
 Alfred E. Smith Building
 Home Savings Bank Building

New Rochelle
 271 North Avenue

North Carolina

 112 Tryon Plaza
 Johnston Building (Charlotte, North Carolina)

Ohio

 AT&T Huron Road Building
 Carew Tower Complex
 Cincinnati American Building
 Fenn Tower
 FirstMerit Tower
 Guardian Bank Building
 Keith Building
 LeVeque Tower
 National City Bank Building
 Parkview Apartments (Cleveland)
 Standard Building
 Superior Building
 Terminal Tower
 The 925 Building

Oklahoma

 320 South Boston Building
 City Place Tower (Oklahoma City)
 First National Center
 Philtower Building

Pennsylvania

 Cathedral of Learning
 Drake Hotel
 Grant Building
 Gulf Tower
 Koppers Tower
 One South Broad
 PSFS Building
 Ritz-Carlton
 Suburban Station
 Wells Fargo Building

Rhode Island

 Industrial National Bank Building
 Rhode Island Hospital Trust Building
 Turk's Head Building

Tennessee

 88 Union Center Memphis
 Andrew Johnson Building
 Crosstown Concourse
 Exchange Building (Memphis)
 Lincoln American Tower
 Madison Hotel (Memphis, Tennessee)
 Number 10 Main Memphis
 Sterchi Lofts, Knoxville
 Sterick Building
 Tennessee Theatre
 The Holston

Texas

 Esperson Buildings
 JPMorgan Chase Building
 Magnolia Hotel
 Tower Life Building

Utah
 Ogden/Weber Municipal Building
 Bigelow-Ben Lomond Hotel

Virginia
 Central National Bank (Richmond, Virginia)
 Hotel John Marshall

Washington

 Seattle Tower

Wisconsin

 AT&T Center (Milwaukee)
 City Center at 735
 Cudahy Tower
 Hilton Milwaukee City Center
 Wells Building
 Wisconsin Gas Building
 Wisconsin Tower

Elsewhere in the world

Australia

Melbourne
 Alkira House
 Australasian Catholic Assurance Building
 Capitol Theatre
 Deva House
 Majorca Building
 Manchester Unity Building

Sydney
 AWA Tower
 Grace Building

Austria

Vienna
 Hochhaus Herrengasse

Argentina

 Kavanagh Building
 Palacio Barolo

Belgium

Antwerp
 Boerentoren
 Century Center

Brussels
 Les Pavillons français 
 Résidence de la Cambre

Ghent
 Centrale Universiteitsbibliotheek

Canada

Montreal
 Royal Bank Tower

Toronto
 Imperial Bank of Commerce Building
 Fairmont Royal York

Vancouver
 Hotel Vancouver

China

Guangzhou 
 Aiqun Hotel
 Nanfang Building

Shanghai 
 Bank of China Building
 Broadway Mansions
 Customs House
 Hengshan Picardie Hotel
 Jinjiang Hotel
 Park Hotel
 Peace Hotel

Hong Kong 
 Hong Kong and Shanghai Banking Corporation Headquarters Building

Czech Republic
Baťa's Skyscraper

Finland
Hotel Torni

France

Villeurbanne

Germany

Aachen

Berlin

Columbushaus
Europahaus

Braunschweig

Chemnitz

Cammann-Hochhaus

Cologne

Hansahochhaus

Dresden

Düsseldorf

Wilhelm Marx House

Essen

Gera

Hamburg

Chilehaus
Brahms Kontor
Meßberghof

Hanover

Jena

Leipzig

Europahaus (Leipzig)

Magdeburg

Munich

Old Technical Town Hall

Stuttgart

Tagblatt-Turm
Breuninger Hochhaus

Hungary

Budapest
 Madách Square Tower (vision)

Italy

Brescia

 Torrione INA

Genoa

Torre Dante
Torre Piacentini

Milan

Snia Viscosa Tower
Palazzo Locatelli

Turin

Torre Littoria

Netherlands

Amsterdam

 De Bazel

Rotterdam

 Witte Huis

GEB toren

New Zealand

 Consultancy House

Poland

Warsaw

 Prudential, Warsaw

Wroclaw

Katowice

Drapacz Chmur

Romania

Bucharest

Telephones Company Building

Russia

 Palace of the Soviets (vision)
 House on the Embankment

Serbia

Palace Albanija

Slovenia

Nebotičnik
South Africa

 Chamber of Mines Building

Spain

Madrid

Edificio Carrión
Edificio Vitalicio
La Unión y el Fénix Español building
Palacio de la Prensa
Telefónica Building

Barcelona

Banco Vitalicio de España

Sweden

Stockholm
 Kungstornen

Gothenburg
 Otterhall

Switzerland

Ukraine

Kyiv
 Government Building, Kyiv

Kharkiv
 Derzhprom
 National University of Kharkiv

United Kingdom

London

55 Broadway
Senate House, London
Shell Mex House
Adelaide House

Manchester

 Quay Street Tower (unbuilt)
 Sunlight House
 Lancaster House, Manchester
 Ship Canal House

Liverpool

Martins Bank Building
India Buildings
Exchange Flags
Wellington Buildings

See also
 List of skyscrapers

References

[UK first iron building 1797 Shrewsbury Flaxmill]

Early skyscrapers